Taitā is one of the northernmost suburbs of the city of Lower Hutt in New Zealand, situated toward the northern end of the city. It lies considerably south of the Taitā Gorge which separates Lower Hutt City from Upper Hutt City, and to the west of the Taitā Cemetery in the suburb of Naenae.

The historic Christ Church, erected in 1853, is the oldest surviving church building in the Wellington region.

Taitā's urban development began around the middle of the 20th century as part of the  Labour Government's  state-housing scheme. The Taita Railway Station  opened in 1947 to serve the developing suburb.

The main road through the western part of the suburb, Taita Drive, has its southern end in the suburb of Avalon, south of the Kennedy-Good Bridge.

On the eastern side of Taitā, above Taita College, stand the buildings of the former Department of Scientific and Industrial Research (DSIR) Soil Bureau. The Soil Bureau became part of Landcare Research New Zealand Limited in 1992 and much of the functionality formerly carried out at Taitā has moved to the Turitea campus of Massey University in Palmerston North.

In December 2019, the approved official geographic name of the suburb was gazetted as "Taitā".

Demographics

Taitā had a population of 6,153 at the 2018 New Zealand census, an increase of 615 people (11.1%) since the 2013 census, and an increase of 96 people (1.6%) since the 2006 census. There were 1,950 households. There were 2,997 males and 3,156 females, giving a sex ratio of 0.95 males per female, with 1,440 people (23.4%) aged under 15 years, 1,410 (22.9%) aged 15 to 29, 2,592 (42.1%) aged 30 to 64, and 714 (11.6%) aged 65 or older.

Ethnicities were 43.9% European/Pākehā, 25.9% Māori, 29.4% Pacific peoples, 15.6% Asian, and 3.9% other ethnicities (totals add to more than 100% since people could identify with multiple ethnicities).

The proportion of people born overseas was 27.6%, compared with 27.1% nationally.

Although some people objected to giving their religion, 34.4% had no religion, 47.1% were Christian, 4.1% were Hindu, 2.0% were Muslim, 1.7% were Buddhist and 3.9% had other religions.

Of those at least 15 years old, 642 (13.6%) people had a bachelor or higher degree, and 1,122 (23.8%) people had no formal qualifications. The employment status of those at least 15 was that 2,112 (44.8%) people were employed full-time, 630 (13.4%) were part-time, and 300 (6.4%) were unemployed.

Education
Taita has four schools:

 Pomare School, a state contributing primary (Year 1 to 6) school with  students as of 
 Saint Michael's School, a state-integrated Catholic full primary (Year 1 to 8) school with  students as of 
 Taita Central School, a state contributing primary (Year 1 to 6) school with  students as of  The school opened in 1948.
 Taita College, a state secondary (Year 9 to 13) school with  students as of  The school opened in 1957.

Intermediate (Year 7 and 8) students from Taitā can attend Avalon Intermediate School, in the neighbouring suburb of Avalon.

External links

References

Suburbs of Lower Hutt
Populated places on Te Awa Kairangi / Hutt River